Pablo Carrera (born 2 August 1986, Bilbao, Spain) is a Spanish sport shooter who competes in the men's 10 metre air pistol and the 50 m pistol. At the 2012 Summer Olympics, he finished 4th in the qualifying round of the 10 metre air pistol, reaching the final with a score of 585.  He finished 6th in the final round with a final score of 683.3.  He also competed in the 50 m pistol, finishing in 22nd place.

References

Spanish male sport shooters
Living people
Olympic shooters of Spain
Shooters at the 2012 Summer Olympics
Shooters at the 2016 Summer Olympics
Shooters at the 2015 European Games
European Games competitors for Spain
1986 births
People from Bilbao
Mediterranean Games bronze medalists for Spain
Mediterranean Games medalists in shooting
Competitors at the 2013 Mediterranean Games
Shooters at the 2019 European Games
21st-century Spanish people